Alfred Kiprato arap Kerich was the first Member of Parliament for Belgut Constituency in Kericho County, Kenya. He served for two terms as a member of the National Assembly between 1963 and 1969 and 1974–1979. He hailed from Kaptebeswet Area in Kericho County.

References 

Members of the National Assembly (Kenya)
Date of birth missing
Place of birth missing
People from Kericho County